Same Trailer Different Park is the debut studio album by American country music artist Kacey Musgraves, released on March 19, 2013, through Mercury Nashville. Musgraves co-wrote all 12 tracks and co-produced the album with Luke Laird and Shane McAnally. The album won the Grammy Award for Best Country Album at the 56th Annual Grammy Awards.

Conception
Same Trailer Different Park draws on styles such as rockabilly, blues rock, country folk, and catchy country pop. Its songs are performed midtempo, and written from a Middle-American perspective, featuring stories of challenges and setbacks faced by men and women who struggle with their surroundings. "Follow Your Arrow" examines the small-minded perspective of small-town life. On "Merry Go 'Round", Musgraves sings over a shuffle beat and banjo about emotional, material, and addictive liabilities that prevent people from escaping restrictive lifestyles. Jonathan Bernstein of American Songwriter wrote that Musgraves's characters are "well-wishers and help-seekers, deadbeats trying to be better and do-gooders that are falling behind", and that she focuses on "small, pivotal moments, when they come to terms with their own faults and dreams, when they’re on the verge of a breakthrough or a meltdown."

Critical reception

At Metacritic, which assigns a rating out of 100 to reviews from mainstream critics, the album has an average score of 89 out of 100, which indicates "universal acclaim" based on 12 reviews. Tammy Ragusa of Country Weekly called it "distinctive in both its arrangements and lyrics." AllMusic's Steve Leggett commended Musgraves' "flair for telling it like it is and making it sound like bedrock, obvious wisdom", and said that the album is "more than a collection of songs just aiming for the country charts." MSN Musics Robert Christgau called her "the finest lyricist to rise up out of conscious country since Miranda Lambert, if not Bobby Pinson himself." Jon Caramanica of The New York Times observed "a boatload of identifying details" in Musgraves' lyrics and called it an "acidic and beautiful" album that is indebted "at least a little bit to Ms. Lambert's durable template." Will Hermes, writing for NPR, said that her "wordplay feels effortless and conversational", and found Musgraves' "spirits of carpe diem and dysfunctional romance" to be "squarely" in the tradition of country music.

Grady Smith of Entertainment Weekly said that the album "continually showcases ... her writing prowess" because "Musgraves has a way of injecting humor into even her most melancholic musings." At Paste, Holly Gleason noted Musgraves "sings unvarnished truths" while maintaining "the sunniness that is the right of the young" that is done "With a voice that’s pretty, but brazen, Musgraves has no problem slinging attitude, crying bullshit or coyly advocating same-sex amour/dope-smoking while skewering hypocrisy." In addition, Gleason saw this album as "a manifesto that'll never come true," which she asked the question "is dignity enough to get by on?", and her response was that by a "thin margin, but one Musgraves walks straight into the sunset." Jody Rosen of Rolling Stone felt that, although Musgraves lacks a powerful singing voice, the album "showcases a songwriting voice you won't hear anywhere else in pop: young, female, downwardly mobile, fiercely witty." David Burger of The Salt Lake Tribune vowed that the album "is not only intriguing vocally but engaging lyrically". Taste of Country's Billy Dukes commented that the album "is well-written, edgy (yet familiar) and coated in 'cool.'" Jerry Shriver of USA Today said the songs are "honest with themselves and don't wallow in self-pity", and that Musgraves' singing is "pretty and clear but usually unsentimental." In December, Rolling Stone ranked Same Trailer Different Park number 28 on its list of the 50 best albums of 2013. It won the Best Country Album award at the 56th Annual Grammy Awards in January 2014. On April 6, 2014, Same Trailer Different Park won Album of the Year at the 49th Annual Academy of Country Music Awards.

Accolades

Commercial performance
Same Trailer Different Park debuted at number two on the US Billboard 200 chart, selling 42,000 copies in its first week. It also debuted at number one on the Top Country Albums chart. The week after the album won two awards and was performed at the 2014 Grammy Awards, sales in the United States increased 146 percent. The week of February 6, 2014, the album returned to number one on the US Top Country Albums chart and saw sales increase a further 177 percent. As of July 2015 the album has sold 519,000 copies in the US. On April 4, 2018, the album was certified platinum by the Recording Industry Association of America (RIAA) for combined sales and album-equivalent units of over a million units in the United States.

Track listing
All tracks are produced by Luke Laird, Shane McAnally, and Kacey Musgraves.

Personnel
Credits adapted from AllMusic and liner notes.

Musicians
 Kacey Musgraves – lead vocals, acoustic guitar, harmonica, whistling, gang vocals 
 Matt Stanfield – keyboards, Wurlitzer electric piano
 John Henry Trinko –accordion
 J. T. Corenflos – electric guitar
 Luke Laird – electric guitar, acoustic guitar, backing vocals, gang vocals 
 Dave Levita – electric guitar
 Rob McNelly – electric guitar
 Kyle Ryan – electric guitar, backing vocals, gang vocals 
 Ilya Toshinsky – electric guitar, acoustic guitar, banjo, resonator guitar
 Oscar Aranda – acoustic guitar
 Misa Arriaga – acoustic guitar, ukulele, backing vocals, gang vocals 
 Josh Osborne – acoustic guitar, backing vocals
 Bucky Baxter – pedal steel guitar
 Russ Pahl — pedal steel guitar
 Jimmie Lee Sloas – bass guitar
 Fred Eltringham – drums, tambourine, foot stomping
 Claire Indie – cello
 Hannah Schroeder – cello
 Kree Harrison – backing vocals
 Natalie Hemby – backing vocals
 Shane McAnally – backing vocals, gang vocals 
 Waffle House background noise on "Blowin' Smoke" recorded by Luke Laird.

Production and technical
 Luke Laird – producer
 Shane McAnally – producer
 Kacey Musgraves – producer, art direction
 Charlie Brocco – recording 
 Ryan Gore – additional recording, mixing
 Leslie Richter – recording assistant
 Mike Stankiewicz – additional recording assistant
 Andrew Mendelson – mastering at Georgetown Masters (Nashville, Tennessee)
 LeAnn "Goddess" Bennett – production coordination
 Mike "Frog" Griffith – production coordination
 Ilya Toshinsky – track coordination
 Kelly Christine Musgraves – art direction, photography
 Karen Naff – art direction, design, illustrations
 Steve Richards – illustrations
 Jason Owen – management

Charts

Weekly charts

Year-end charts

Certifications

References

2013 debut albums
Kacey Musgraves albums
Mercury Records albums
Albums produced by Shane McAnally
Grammy Award for Best Country Album
Country pop albums